Gentlemen Among Themselves (German: Die fidele Herrenpartie or Herren unter sich) is a 1929 German silent comedy film directed by Rudolf Walther-Fein and starring Hermann Picha, Lydia Potechina and Maria Paudler. It was shot at the Staaken Studios in Berlin. The film's sets were designed by Botho Hoefer and Hans Minzloff.

Cast
 Hermann Picha as Peter Fistelhahn, Inhaber eines Schönheitssalons 
 Lydia Potechina as Brunhilde, seine Frau  
 Maria Paudler as Wally, deren Tochter  
 Fritz Kampers as Fritz Köster, Friseurgehilfe  
 Truus Van Aalten as Erika Bollmann, Lehrmädchen
 Walter Rilla as Heinz Rüdiger, Student der Medizin  
 Jaro Fürth as Dr. Egermann, Arzt 
 Gaston Briese as Schlachtmeister Wulkow  
 Elly Nerger as Frau Wulkow  
 Eva Speyer as Seine Frau

References

Bibliography
 Bock, Hans-Michael & Bergfelder, Tim. The Concise Cinegraph: Encyclopaedia of German Cinema. Berghahn Books, 2009.

External links

1929 films
Films of the Weimar Republic
German silent feature films
Films directed by Rudolf Walther-Fein
German black-and-white films
Films shot at Staaken Studios
1929 comedy films
German comedy films
1920s German films